Bruno Henrique Fortunato Aguiar (born 25 March 1986), known as Bruno Aguiar, is a Brazilian professional footballer who plays as a defender for Brusque.

Career
As of 6 September 2008, he played 17 Campeonato Brasileiro Série A games, having scored one goal., he left than on 31 January 2009 Figueirense.

Honours
Santos
 Campeonato Paulista: 2010, 2011
 Copa do Brasil: 2010
 Copa Libertadores: 2011

Joinville
 Campeonato Brasileiro Série B: 2014

References

External links

 
 

1986 births
Living people
Brazilian footballers
Mirassol Futebol Clube players
Figueirense FC players
Guarani FC players
Santos FC players
Sport Club do Recife players
Associação Desportiva São Caetano players
Joinville Esporte Clube players
Muaither SC players
Grêmio Esportivo Brasil players
Expatriate footballers in Qatar
Campeonato Brasileiro Série A players
Campeonato Brasileiro Série B players
Qatar Stars League players
Association football defenders
People from Amparo, São Paulo